The 44th Annual GMA Dove Awards presentation ceremony was held on Tuesday, October 15, 2013 at the Allen Arena. It returned to Nashville, Tennessee after being away for two years.  The ceremony recognized the accomplishments of musicians and other figures within the Christian music industry since the previous ceremony in April 2012. The ceremony was produced by the Gospel Music Association and was hosted by singers Kirk Franklin and Amy Grant.  The awards show was broadcast on the UP television network on October 21, 2013.

Performers

Presenters and introducers
Brandon Heath / Mandisa
Montell Jordan / Jaci Velasquez / David Mann
Julie Bulloch / Rusty Bulloch / Britt Nicole
Dr. Louie Giglio
Rick Warren / Joyce Meyer
Francesca Battistelli
Jamie Grace / Chris August
Amy Grant
LeCrae / Bart Millard
Blanca Callahan from Group 1 Crew / Isaac Carree from Men of Standard
Kari Jobe / Candace Cameron Bure
Michael W. Smith
Jason Crabb / Jon Foreman of Switchfoot

Winners
Song of the Year
"10,000 Reasons (Bless the Lord)"
(performer) Matt Redman; (writers) Matt Redman & Jonas Myrin; (publishers) ThankYou Music, Sixsteps Music, WorshipTogether.com, Said and Done Music, and Shout! Publishing
Songwriter of the Year
Matt Redman
Contemporary Christian Performance of the Year
"10,000 Reasons (Bless the Lord)"
Matt Redman for EMI Records; Nathan Nockels
Southern Gospel Performance of the Year
"What the Blood is For"
Jason Crabb for Gaither Music Group; Wayne Haun
Gospel Performance of the Year
"Break Every Chain"
Tasha Cobbs for EMI Records; VaShawn Mitchell
Artist of the Year
TobyMac
New Artist of the Year
For King & Country
Producer of the Year
Ed Cash
Rap/Hip Hop Recorded Song of the Year
"Tell The World"
(performers) Lecrae ft. Mali Music; (writers) Lecrae Moore, Kortney Pollard, Torrance “Street Symphony” Esmond, Charles Dunlap, Lincoln Morris
Rock Recorded Song of the Year
"Sick of It"
(performer) Skillet; (writers) John L. Cooper, Scott Stevens
Rock/Contemporary Recorded Song of the Year
"Keep Your Eyes Open"
(performer) NEEDTOBREATHE; (writers) Bear Rinehart, Bo Rinehart
Pop/Contemporary Recorded Song of the Year
"10,000 Reasons (Bless the Lord)"
(performer) Matt Redman; (writers) Matt Redman, Jonas Myrin
Inspirational Recorded Song of the Year
"Satisfied"
Jason Crabb, Tony Wood, Ronnie Freeman
Southern Gospel Recorded Song of the Year
"What The Blood Is For"
Jason Crabb, Ronnie Freeman, Tony Wood
Bluegrass Recorded Song of the Year
"He Washed My Soul"
(performer) The Little Roy & Lizzy Show; (writers) Wayne Haun, Jamie Helms, Ruby Moody, Ron Haun
Country Recorded Song of the Year
"From My Rags To His Riches"
(performers) Devin McGlamery with Dailey & Vincent; (writers) Ernie Haase, Wayne Haun, Joel Lindsey
Contemporary Gospel/Urban Recorded Song of the Year
"Break Every Chain"
(performer) Tasha Cobbs; (writer) William Reagan
Traditional Gospel Recorded Song of the Year
"Take Me to the King"
(performer) Tamela Mann; (writer) Kirk Franklin
Worship Song of the Year
"10,000 Reasons (Bless the Lord)"
(performer) Matt Redman; (writers) Matt Redman & Jonas Myrin; (publishers) ThankYou Music, Sixsteps Music, WorshipTogether.com, Said and Done Music, and Shout! Publishing
Rap/Hip Hop Album of the Year
Gravity
(performer) Lecrae; (producers) Heat Academy, Joseph Prielozny, J.R., The Watchmen, Dru Castro, Uforo Ebong, Tyshane, DJ Official, Rudy Currence
Rock Album of the Year 
Release the Panic
(performer) RED; (producer) Howard Benson
Rock/Contemporary Album of the Year
A Messenger
(performer) Colton Dixon; (producers) Adam Watts, Andy Dodd, Gannin Arnold, David Garcia
Pop/Contemporary Album of the Year
Eye on It
(performer) TobyMac; (producers) David Garcia, Toby McKeehan, Christopher Stevens, Jamie Moore, Telemitry
Inspirational Album of the Year
Love is Stronger
(performer) Jason Crabb; (producers) Jay DeMarcus, Ed Cash, Wayne Haun
Southern Gospel Album of the Year (TIED)
Pure and Simple
(performer) Gaither Vocal Band; (producers) Bill Gaither, Ben Isaacs, Michael English, David Phelps
Canton Junction
Michael Sykes, Aaron Crabb
Bluegrass Album of the Year
The Gospel Side of Dailey & Vincent
Darrin Vincent, Jamie Dailey
Country Album of the Year
Eyes Wide Open
(performer) Jeff & Sheri Easter; (producers) Jeff & Sheri Easter, Greg Cole, Madison Easter
Contemporary Gospel/Urban Album of the Year
Grace
(performer) Tasha Cobbs; (producers) VaShawn Mitchell; Vaughan Phoenix
Traditional Gospel Album of the Year
Best Days
(performer) Tamela Mann; (producers) Myron Butler, David Mann, Tamela Mann
Instrumental Album of the Year
Glory
(performer) Michael W. Smith; (producers) David Hamilton, Michael W. Smith
Children's Music Album of the Year
Look Up
Gateway Next; Josh Alltop
Spanish Language Album of the Year
Global Project Espanol
Hillsong; Andrew Crawford, Steve McPherson, Toni Romero
Special Event Album of the Year
Passion: Let The Future Begin
Chris Tomlin, Kristian Stanfill, Matt Redman, Brett Younker, Kari Jobe, Crowder, Christy Nockels
Christmas Album of the Year
JOY
Steven Curtis Chapman; (producers) Brent Milligan, Steven Curtis Chapman
Praise and Worship Album of the Year
Burning Lights
(performer) Chris Tomlin; (producers) Jason Ingram, Ed Cash, Dan Muckala
Musical of the Year
Christ The Redeemer
Joel Lindsey, Jeff Bumgardner, Daniel Simpson; Daniel Semsen
Youth/Children's Musical of the Year
Blast Off!
Celeste Clydesdale, David T. Clydesdale
Choral Collection of the Year
A Merry Clydesdale Christmas
David T. Clydesdale
Recorded Music Packaging
Eye on It
Jan Cook; Eddy Boer, Sarah Sung; Wendy Palau; Lee Steffen; Boerhaus
Short Form Music Video of the Year 
"Eye on It"
TobyMac ft. Britt Nicole; Eric Welch
Long Form Music Video of the Year
Hillsong UNITED: Live in Miami
Andrew Crawford, Joel Houston, Had Gillies
Inspirational Film of the Year
Courageous
Alex Kendrick; Stephen Kendrick

Special awards
"Uplift Someone" 2013 Award – Mandisa for the video and song "Overcomer"
Bill Gaither tribute
The Bible miniseries tribute
Billy Graham tribute

References

External links 
 

2013 music awards
GMA Dove Awards
2013 in American music
2013 in Tennessee
GMA